The Symphony No. 8 of Roger Sessions was composed in 1968.

It is a work in two movements lasting together about fourteen minutes:
Adagio e mesto
Allegro con brio

Noteworthy in the context of Sessions' symphonies is the use of maracas to accompany the theme in the first movement. Andrea Olmstead describes all of Sessions's symphonies as "serious" and "funereal", with No. 8 being one of four with, "quiet reflective endings." No. 8 combines the, "fearsome rhythmic and harmonic densities," of his maturity, "with the extended melodic phrases," which were always characteristic of Sessions.

The symphony was premiered on May 2, 1968, by the New York Philharmonic conducted by William Steinberg.

Instrumentation
The symphony is scored for a large orchestra consisting of three flutes (third doubling alto flute), three oboes, four clarinets (fourth doubling E clarinet), four bassoons (fourth doubling contrabassoon), four horns, three trumpets, four trombones, tuba, timpani, two percussionists, piano, harp, and strings.

Recordings
Frederik Prausnitz, conducting the New Philharmonia Orchestra. LP recording, 1 disc. Argo ZRG 702. Calouste Gulbenkian Foundation Series 3. 1973. With Sessions' Rhapsody for Orchestra and works by Wallingford Riegger and Thea Musgrave.
Leon Botstein, conducting the American Symphony Orchestra. Recorded 9 October 2004, at the Richard B. Fisher Center for the Performing Arts, Bard College New York. CD recording, 1 disc. New World Records 80631-2. New York: Recorded Anthology of American Music, 2005. With works by Aaron Copland, George Perle and Bernard Rands.

References

Further reading
 Imbrie, Andrew (1972). "The Symphonies of Roger Sessions". Tempo (new series), no. 103 (December): 24–32.
 Kress, Steven Morton (1982). "Roger Sessions, Composer and Teacher: A Comparative Analysis of Roger Sessions' Philosophy of Educating Composers and His Approach to Composition in Symphonies No. 2 and 8". PhD diss. Gainesville: University of Florida.

Symphonies by Roger Sessions
1968 compositions
Atonal compositions
Music commissioned by the New York Philharmonic